The World Championship of Ping Pong, also known as WCPP, is an annual ping pong tournament that has been held since 2011. The current champion is Andrew Baggaley, who beat Alexander Flemming in the 2020 final to beat Maxim Shmyrev's record of winning three championships, and become the record-breaking four-time champion.

The tournament is promoted by the English sports impresario Barry Hearn, and is distinguished by its use of old-fashioned wooden paddles covered with sandpaper, which are intended to encourage slower ball movement and longer rallies for the entertainment of the live audience.

Finals

The 2020 championship took place January 25–26, 2019, at Alexandra Palace for the eighth time.

Broadcasters

United Kingdom and Ireland 
The tournament is currently broadcast live on Sky Sports.

International 
The tournament is also broadcast live and free on Facebook.

References

External links
 
Facebook
Twitter

 
Table tennis competitions
Alexandra Palace
Ping Pong
Recurring sporting events established in 2011